Casoncelli (in Eastern Lombard) are a kind of stuffed pasta, typical of the culinary tradition of Lombardy, in the north-central part of Italy.

Alternatively it is a disk folded in two and shaped like a sweet wrapper. Casoncelli in the style alla bergamasca are typically stuffed with a mixture of bread crumbs, egg, Parmesan, ground beef, salami or sausage. Variants of filling include spinach, raisins, amaretto biscuits, pear, and garlic; while the casoncelli alla bresciana are stuffed with a mixture of bread crumbs, Parmesan, garlic, parsley, nutmeg and broth. They are typically served with burro e salvia: melted butter flavored with sage leaves.

See also

References

Cuisine of Lombardy
Pasta dishes
Stuffed dishes